This is a list of notable manga that have been licensed in English, listed by their English title. This list does not cover anime, light novels, dōjinshi, manhwa, manhua, manga-influenced comics, or manga only released in Japan in bilingual Japanese-English editions.

When English-language licenses for a series are held by publishers in different regions, this is distinguished by the following abbreviations: NA for North America, UK for the United Kingdom, SG for Singapore, HK for Hong Kong, and ANZ for Australia and New Zealand. Where only one publisher has licensed a series, the region is not indicated. Series with minor title changes over publication have been combined.


Manga by English title

!–9

A

Amzn by Muhammad Abldul and publish by Qatar manga group

B

C

D

E

F

G

H

I

J

K

L

M

N

O

P

Q

R

S

T

U

V

W

X

Y

Z

See also
 Manga
 List of manga magazines
 List of video games based on anime or manga
 List of films based on manga
 List of hentai manga published in English
 Dōjinshi (self-published manga)
 Anime (Japanese animation)
 Light novel (short novels with manga illustrations)
 List of light novels
 Manhwa (Korean comics)
 List of manhwa
 Manhua (Chinese comics)
 List of manhua
 Original English-language manga (non-Japanese comics that are influenced by Japanese art styles)

Notes

References

Licensed in English